William Direen (born 1957) is a New Zealand writer and performer. He graduated from Canterbury University (Christchurch) with the John Tinline Prize (1980) and M.A. Hons. (1st). His masters thesis was titled The influence of Japanese noh, Balinese dance-drama and the Kathakali on four twentieth century western playwrights.  He directed Blue Ladder Theatre at 87 Cashel Street, Christchurch, and later produced a series of experimental "psycho-musicals" in Wellington. Later writing (1994–present) ranges from criticism and speculative fiction to poetry sometimes performed with collaborating musicians. From 2006 to 2017 he edited the trans-cultural literary annual Percutio, "dedicated to aspects of the creative process and to works that bridge cultures". He edited a special anthology in 2021 to oppose cost-cutting depletion of New Zealand National Library's non-NZ books. His public persona performs music, solo and in groups such as The Bilders and the trio Ferocious. He has made small tours of USA, Europe, Serbia and Australia, has strong ties with France, and now lives in Otago, New Zealand. He is the subject of a documentary, Bill Direen, A Memory of Others, directed by Simon Ogston (2017).

Bibliography
 Seasons (72pp, 2022) is a poem that spans a year in Otago, New Zealand. ISBN 978-1-99-116710-1.
 Overboard2, 160 years of fine acquisitions and inadequate storage leading to disposals on an unprecedented scale at the National Library of New Zealand. 2021. 28pp. 
 M.A.L.A, spoken and sung poems integrated in collaboration with musicians Steve Cournane and William Henry Meung. The full title of the release is Move Along, Love Among. The texts were published in a 26pp accompanying brochure. 2021.
 Ferocious, texts integrated in collaboration with musicians Mark Williams and Johannes Contag, published in booklet accompanying audio release. (20pp, RAT D-095 2020; UPC 822601400955).
 Road Runner, a poetic "record and testament to [...] a twelve date tour of Eastern USA". (40 pp, 2020).
 NS USAAUS RZ, a sampler of poetry and prose extracts from novels from 2006 to 2019, sold during tours of Serbia, USA, Australia and NZ (44pp, 2019).
 EN WOLFSKEHL ZU, a poetic tribute to the life of Karl Wolfskehl in New Zealand (1938–48) and to his partner in New Zealand, Dr. Margot Ruben (20pp, 2019).
 Enclosures 2–4, further titles in the Enclosures series containing essay, song lyrics, fiction, interview, diary (of an outpatient), experimental fiction, travel diary, creative essay , auto-biography, poetry, fiction, science fiction (zootopia) and utopian vision . 2016–2018. Enclosures info
 Christchurch, Canal City, futuristic utopian vision of a Christchurch preserving historical suburban identities, with elevated trains, networks of canals and other approaches to organising a new society. Published in Percutio 2014, Nr. 8.
 The Book of Flanagan Christchurch pre-history, flora and fauna, arrival of humans and recent events including the Christchurch earthquakes. Edition of one. Exhibited at Christchurch Art Gallery as part of larger exhibition containing many further booklets filled by guests, conceived by artist Scott Flanagan, 2011.
 Versions Translations (Poetry, Kilmog Press, 2014). Responses to a range of European language poems, later enlarged and published with an introduction discussing each poem, in 'Percutio 2017'.
 Utopia Rag (Novel, Tank Press, 2014). Reissue of the road novel of 2002, set in the South Island of New Zealand.
 The Ballad of Rue Belliard (Novel, The Writers Group, 2013). Author name, Guillaume Direen. An experimental romance set within a community on the outer perimeter of Paris. Entire issue of  No. 48.
 Wormwood (Novel, Titus Books, 2012). Re-edition of the 1997 experimental novel set in Berlin. 
 Tourtagebuch (Diary, Titus Books, 2012). . German translation by Arno Loeffler of Direen's 1994 personal diary of a European performance tour.
 Fallen to a Field. Poem in five parts recorded with Jonathan Crayford (piano) at NZ Embassy in Paris. 30 mins. Broadcast Radio New Zealand Concert, 10 July 2012. Percutio 2011. 
 Dunedin Poems (Kilmog Press, 2011). 
 Devonport, A Diary Diary impressions of Devonport, Auckland, during tenure of the University of Auckland Fellowship at the Michael King Writers Centre in 2010. (Signalman's House Series Nº.1, Holloway Press, University of Auckland, 2011) 
 L. A novella, set in New Zealand in the midst of guerrilla warfare between two economic factions; the world has been reshaped after geological upheavals. Published in an anthology of NZ speculative fiction writers A Foreign Country. (Random Static. Anna Caro & Juliet Buchanan, editors). 2010. 
 Enclosures. First work in the Enclosures series, containing Jonah (at Kapiti), The Stadium (history of a people confined to a biosphere), a folk tale and autobiographical content. 2010 & 2008 (1st edition)  Enclosures (1) info
 Song of the Brakeman (Novel, 2006). Apocalyptic vision of a future South Pacific. Science fiction novel. (Titus Books) 
 New Sea Land, long poem with a triple focus, upon the new (childhood), land and ocean, which accumulates refrains of acclamatory word-groupings relating to New Zealand culture or history. 
 Coma (three novellas, 2005). 'Digging Ground', a tale of separation and momentary reunion, 'Sunshower', a monologue of an abusive encounter on a country road, and 'Coma', a life-thread recounted by a young woman in a drug-related blackout. 
 Jules (Novel, 2003). 24 hours in the life of a Parisian art teacher, who is hallucinating characters from the paintings he researches. (Alpha Books) 
 Onaevia (Fable, 2002). Short history and mythology of an imaginary land. (Alpha Books) 
 Nusquama (also published as Utopia Rag), 2002. Several stories told in different voices, describing the family histories of a musician (Mike) and of his spouse (Fay) up until the first person monologue of their daughter, victim of a rape. The stories are interlaced with that of the apparently accidental death of Fay's father when she was a child. Nusquama was translated into German by Arno Loeffler in 2005 (Titus Books ).
 Wormwood (short novel), 1997. Tale of a refugee from the Balkan wars of the 1990s, his affair with a Berlin woman (originally from West Germany), and his involvement with a criminal group originally from West Berlin, which wishes to control profitable areas in former East Berlin. Published in its entirety in SPORT 18  1997; reissued in chapbook form to be sold at performances; thereafter translated into Serbian (Pelen) by Milan Pupezin for Partizanska knjiga in 2019. 
 Editor Percutio, a trans-cultural literary annual (poetry, fiction extracts, translations & versions, essays, reviews and history). 2006, −07, −08, −09, −10, −11, −12, −13, −14, −15. 16, 17. Guest Editor of Landfall No. 219 'On Music'. ISBN of Landfall #219 as separate book ;  brief No. 36 and No. 42.

Translations
 German: Die Fabrik (The Factory) in the collection Dies ist eine wahre Geschichte: Neuseelandische Autoren in Berlin, translated by Cornelia C. Walter, DAAD Berliner Kunstlerprogramm, 2002. 109pp. . 114 pages, 10 images.
 German: Nusquama (English title Nusquama/Utopia Rag, 2002) "aus dem neuseelaendischen Englisch von Arno Loeffler". 2005.
 German: Tourtagebuch (Tour Diary), translated by Arno Löffler. . 2012. 
 French: La princess et le musicien (The Princess and the Musician, 2008), in Temporel, translated by Anne Mounic. 2009.
 Serbian: Pelen (Wormwood, 1997), translated by Milan Pupezin. Partizanska Knjiga, Kikinda, 2019.

Awards and fellowships
 Royal Society Award for Secondary School Science, 1972 (now The Prime Minister's Future Scientist Prize)
 John Tinline Prize for English, 1980, Canterbury University, Christchurch, NZ.
 M.A. Hons (1st Class), 1982, Canterbury University, Christchurch, NZ.
 University of Auckland Writers Resident at the Michael King Centre, 2010.
 The novella ‘L’, set in the South Pacific after geological and political upheavals (from the collection A Foreign Country, edited by Anna Caro and Juliet Buchanan, Random Static, 2010), was nominated for the 2011 Sir Julius Vogel SF Awards. The anthology itself won Best Collected Work award.

Critical responses
 Early theatre work (1981–87): "hard driving rhythms and surreal imagery".
James K. Baxter's Three Mimes "receive[d] intelligent and effective treatment".
 To Bitumen (play) "an evocative memory piece… strong on physical sensations".
To Fowkes Alive (music-theatre): "a struggle against primeval and futuristic obstacles", "a gentle 'musical delirium' which raises smiles rather than laughter", "the surrealistic tale of a 'petrolhead' whose life flashes before his eyes the moment that he dies in a violent accident"
 To Dial a Claw (music-theatre): "a living experiment in alternative staging";
 To Raoul (song cycle): "an exploration of exploitation", a story told "from its beginnings in the wastelands of kiwi suburbia to its chilly… conclusion.".
 To Wormwood: "Entropy and death read as metaphors for the implosion of post-war Europe and the failure of capitalism.".
To Nusquama: "A well-written often humorous paradigm for the 21st century".
 To The Impossible: "Direen's heightened ear for absurdity serves this collection well"
 To Jules: "Romantic stereotypes collide noisily with modern realities and growing older means a confused prostate and even more complexing emotions. Jules is the story of a man at life's pivotal point.". "It's a delightful book, but it's a book to read as series of literary compositions." Jules was also described as "an indolent digression through European culture, art and Paris."
 To the novellas: "a quick and devastating appearance"
 To Song of the Brakeman: "a vividly conceived world here, manifesting slowly and brilliantly through its accumulating signs"
 To Versions Translations: "the dark-tinted heart of the night, in the dense heart of the shade and very centre of the wind." Jacques Coulardeau imaginative critique, 2014.
 To Versions Translations: "uses lovely – what I think of as reverse or encapsulating – cadences." Jan Kemp criticism, 2014.
 To the documentary 'A Memory of Others': "[situates] him within the 20th century poetic and wider literary traditions".

References

External links
Writer Profile on New Zealand Book Council website
Creative NZ residency
Personal website
Dynamite Hemorrhage interview
AudioCulture profile
brief literary magazine (The Writers Group, publisher).
Devonport, A Diary, Holloway Press
Critique of a bilingual edition of the work of Karl Wolfskehl
Extended extract from the film Bill Direen: A Memory of Others dir. Simon Ogston at NZ On Screen

New Zealand male novelists
21st-century New Zealand poets
New Zealand male poets
New Zealand male short story writers
University of Canterbury alumni
20th-century New Zealand novelists
21st-century New Zealand novelists
Living people
Writers from Christchurch
New Zealand songwriters
Male songwriters
20th-century New Zealand short story writers
21st-century New Zealand short story writers
20th-century New Zealand male writers
21st-century New Zealand male writers
1957 births
Musicians from Christchurch